The 2010 Yukon/NWT Men's Curling Championship was held February 6–9 at the Whitehorse Curling Club in Whitehorse, Yukon. The winning team of Jamie Koe represented the Territories at the 2010 Tim Hortons Brier in Halifax, Nova Scotia.

Teams

Standings

Results

February 7
Draw 1
Koe 11-3 Skauge
Cowan 8-4 Solberg

Draw 2
Koe 9-3 Cowan
Skauge 6-5 Solberg

Draw 3
Cowan 9-7 Solberg
Koe 5-4 Skauge

February 8
Draw 4
Cowan 6-3 Skauge
Solberg 8-4 Koe

Draw 5
Solberg 9-8 Skauge
Koe 7-5 Cowan

February 9
Draw 6
Cowan 5-4 Skauge
Solberg 8-7 Koe

Tie breaker
Koe 5-3 Cowan

Yukon/nwt Mens Curling Championship, 2011
2010 in Yukon
Curling in Yukon